Statistics of Portuguese Liga in the 1950–51 season.

Overview

It was contested by 14 teams, and Sporting Clube de Portugal won the championship.

League standings

Results

References

Primeira Liga seasons
Primeira Divisão
Portugal